The University of Western Brittany (UBO) is a French university, located in Brest, in the Academy of Rennes. On a national scale, in terms of graduate employability, the university oscillates between 18th and 53rd out of 69 universities depending on fields of study. Overall, the university is ranked 12th out of 76 universities in France.

Location

The University of Western Brittany is in Brittany, on the north-western coast of France. It is a multicampus university, with the main site in Brest and satellite campuses in Quimper and Morlaix.
Brest is an hour from Paris by air, or four hours by train.
Brest is one of the world's marine science capitals and is home to 60% of French marine researchers, as well as several major organizations such as IFREMER and IPEV. The city is also famous for its sailing activities. Brittany's economic development is driven by the agri-food, health, and telecommunications sectors.

Academics

French universities function via a system of collegiate administration. Each institution is led by a team of lecturer-researchers and overseen by a president, bringing together representatives from all affiliated faculties and institutes, as well as student-elected delegates. Universities are chiefly financed by the French government.

List of faculties and schools 

6 faculties
 Humanities and Social Sciences
 Science and Technology
 Law, Economics and Management
 Education and Sports Sciences
 Medicine and Health Sciences
 Dentistry

7 specialized institutes
 Institut Universitaire de Technologie de Brest (IUT),
 Institut Universitaire de Technologie de Quimper (IUT),
 Institut d’Administration des Entreprises (IAE) in Morlaix,
 Institut Universitaire Européen de la Mer (IUEM),
 École supérieure du professorat et de l'éducation (ESPE),
 Euro Institut d’Actuariat (EURIA),
 Institut de Formation en Masso-Kinésithérapie (IFMK), in partnership with the University Hospital of Brest.

1 engineering school
 École Supérieure d’Ingénieurs en Agroalimentaire de Bretagne atlantique (ESIAB)

1 midwifery school
 École de sage-femme, in partnership with the University Hospital of Brest.

Research

French research is essentially academic in nature, encompassing the work of university laboratories and their partner organisations. UBO is home to 37 laboratories, some of which are supported by prestigious French research bodies, such as CNRS, INSERM, and IRD.
There are four principal areas of research at UBO :
 Marine Sciences
 Health, Agrifood and Materials
 Maths-ICT
 Humanities and Social Sciences

Notable people

Alumni
 Philippe Collin, anchor for France Inter radio
 Benoît Hamon, politician and former minister of National Education
 François Cuillandre, politician and current mayor of the city of Brest
 Didier Le Gac, politician and member of the National Assembly of France for the city of Brest
 Joëlle Bergeron, politician and current member of the Europarliament
 Christophe Miossec, musician and singer
 Tristan Nihouarn, musician and singer
 Christian Gourcuff, former football player and manager
 Paul Le Guen, former football player and manager 
 Chantal Conand, marine biologist
 Kofi Yamgnane, politician and engineer

Faculty
 Fátima Rodríguez (b. 1961), writer, translator

See also
 List of public universities in France by academy

References

Educational institutions established in 1970
University of Western Brittany